Hanwha Aqua Planet Jeju (아쿠아 플라넷 제주) is an aquarium that opened in 2012 in the Jeju Province, South Korea. 
It is an aquarium operated by Aqua Planet  and is the largest public aquarium in South Korea.

Exhibits

Aqua Planet Jeju, It consists of three marine-themed halls, consisting of an "ocean arena" (performance hall) and a "marine science" (science museum) and "aquarium".
Large sharks and rays such as Sand Tiger and Giant guitarfish are bred in the aquarium. There is also a tunnel inside the aquarium. 
The main creatures are penguins, seals, sea lions, walruses, arapaima gigas, sand tiger sharks, giant groupers.

In addition, the public aquarium carries out regular beach cleaning and underwater purification work, and has established South Korea's first specialized medical center for marine life, and is engaged in many activities for the conservation of marine life. In addition, Aqua Planet Jeju has educational programs such as a diving experience program in the main tank and an ecological briefing session for otters and penguins.

Aqua Planet Jeju has started a special exhibition of Minions for about a year from July 31, 2020.

Shows
The aquarium has a large dolphin and walrus show. Many shows are held in Ocean arena and are hosted by the Eastern European Synchronized Swimming Team.

Controversies
Initially, two whale sharks and one manta ray were captivity in the main tank. However, it received a lot of criticism from animal rights groups because one whale shark and one manta ray died. An official at Aqua Planet Jeju explained that "the cause of death of fish is chronic renal failure and there is no cure", but public opinion moved to release the remaining whale shark, so it was tagged and released.

See also
Aqua Planet 
Aqua Planet 63
Hanwha Group

Notes

External links

(en)

Aquaria in South Korea
Jeju Province
2012 establishments in South Korea